Camaya may refer to the following places in the Philippines:

 Camaya Coast, beach resort
 Camaya Falls, collection of three waterfalls